Muhammad Ibrahim (born 1 December 1945) is a Bangladeshi academic. He is a former professor of physics at University of Dhaka. He is the moderator of the show Desh o Biggyan on Bangladesh Television. He is the editor of Bigyan Shamoiki, the first monthly science magazine of Bangladesh. Since January 2015, he has been serving as a professor of the General Education Department at University of Liberal Arts Bangladesh (ULAB).

Ibrahim is the recipient of Bangla Academy Literary Award (2006) in the science category.

Background and education
Ibrahim is the fourth among the nine children in the family. One of his elder brothers is the Nobel Laureate Muhammad Yunus. He studied at the Chittagong College. Around 1962, he got admitted into the physics department of the University of Dhaka where he completed his bachelor's and master's in 1965 and 1966 respectively. He earned his Ph.D. from the University of Southampton on surface physics in 1972.

Career
Ibrahim was a faculty member in University of Dhaka's Physics Department until he retired in 2012. He served as the director of Renewable Energy Research Centre at the same university. He also served as a visiting professor in BRAC University.

Ibrahim is the founder and executive director of Centre for Mass Education and Science (CMES), an NGO which aims to promote the use of science and technology at the root level.

Awards
 Bangla Academy Literary Award (2006)
 WorldAware Business Award (2004)
 Institute of Diploma Engineer Gold Medal (2000)
 Qudrat-E-Khuda Gold Medal (1989)
 Agroni Bank Award for Children Literature (1987)

References

External links

Living people
1945 births
People from Chittagong
University of Dhaka alumni
Alumni of the University of Southampton
Academic staff of the University of Dhaka
Bangladeshi television personalities
Recipients of Bangla Academy Award
Academic staff of the University of Liberal Arts Bangladesh